Sara Serrat Reyes (born 15 September 1995) is a Spanish footballer who plays as a goalkeeper for Segunda División club CDE Racing Féminas.

Club career
Sara left her longtime club Sporting de Huelva in 2019.

International career
Sara was included in the Spain's provisional squad for the 2015 FIFA Women's World Cup. She played her first match in 2019.

Honours
Copa de la Reina de Fútbol: 2015

References

External links
 
 
 

1995 births
Living people
Women's association football goalkeepers
Spanish women's footballers
Footballers from Huelva
Spain women's international footballers
Primera División (women) players
Sporting de Huelva players
Sevilla FC (women) players
Spain women's youth international footballers
CDE Racing Féminas players